Neil F. Hartigan (born  May 4, 1938) is an American jurist, lawyer and politician from Illinois. He served as the Attorney General of Illinois, the 40th Lieutenant Governor, and a justice of the Illinois Appellate Court. Hartigan was also the Democratic nominee for governor in 1990, but lost the close race to Republican Jim Edgar.

Background
Hartigan grew up in Chicago's Rogers Park neighborhood, in an Irish Catholic family. His father David was Alderman of the 49th Ward. Hartigan graduated from Loyola Academy.

Upon graduation, He went on to attend and graduate from Georgetown University in Washington, D.C. with a bachelor's degree. He received a juris doctor degree from Loyola University College of Law in 1966.

Upon completion of law school Hartigan worked for a couple years for the city of Chicago. He served as the city's legislative counsel in Springfield, as attorney for the Chicago Board of Health and as general counsel for the Chicago Park District.
Hartigan was elected the Democratic Committeeman for the 49th ward in 1968 and served in the position until stepping down in 1980. Former state legislator Michael Brady defeated Hartigan's choice, Cook County Treasurer Edward J. Rosewell in the Democratic primary.

Court Positions

In 2002, Hartigan won election to the Illinois Appellate Court from the First District, which is composed of Cook County, Illinois to fill a vacancy created by the retirement of Robert Chapman Buckley.

After two years, Hartigan chose to retire voluntarily from the bench. Hartigan's retirement date was June 1, 2004. He was succeeded by P. Scott Neville Jr.

Hartigan was a member of Hillary Clinton's Illinois Steering Committee and February 5 Rapid Responders. 

On March 22, 2013, Governor Pat Quinn appointed Hartigan to the Illinois Court of Claims for a term starting March 18, 2013 and ending January 21, 2019. Hartigan was confirmed by the Illinois Senate on May 2, 2013. He succeed Norma F. Jann. The Court rules on claims filed against state, except those under Workers' Compensation or Workers' Occupational DiseasesActs, or claims for expenses in civil litigation. Hartigan officially ended his term in July 2019.

External links 
 1973–1974 Illinois Blue Book
 1975–1976 Illinois Blue Book p36

References 

|-

|-

|-

1938 births
Notre Dame Fighting Irish football players
Living people
American people of Irish descent
Georgetown University alumni
Illinois Democrats
Illinois Attorneys General
Lieutenant Governors of Illinois
Politicians from Chicago
Judges of the Illinois Appellate Court
Schools of the Sacred Heart alumni
Loyola University Chicago School of Law alumni